Rodaba is a genus of moths of the family Crambidae.

Species
Rodaba angulipennis Moore, 1888
Rodaba violalis Caradja in Caradja & Meyrick, 1937

References

Natural History Museum Lepidoptera genus database

Pyraustinae
Crambidae genera
Taxa named by Frederic Moore